Springfield Township, Indiana may refer to:

 Springfield Township, Allen County, Indiana
 Springfield Township, Franklin County, Indiana
 Springfield Township, LaGrange County, Indiana
 Springfield Township, LaPorte County, Indiana

See also
Springfield Township (disambiguation)

Indiana township disambiguation pages